Røssvoll is a village in the municipality of Rana in Nordland county, Norway. The village is on the north side of the river Ranelva (the village of Skonseng lies on the south side of the river). The European route E06 highway passes through the village, passing right by Røssvoll Church in the centre of the village. Mo i Rana Airport, Røssvoll is also here.

References

Rana, Norway
Villages in Nordland